, sometimes called Ashi-gatame for short, is one of the official 29 grappling techniques of Kodokan Judo. It is one of the nine joint techniques of the Kansetsu-waza list, one of the three grappling lists in Judo's Katame-waza enumerating 29 grappling techniques.

Similar Techniques, Variants, and Aliases 
IJF Official Names:
Ude-hishigi-ashi-gatame(腕挫脚固)
U.H. ashi-gatame
Ashi-gatame(脚固)
AGA

Alias: 
Leg Armlock 
Ude-hishigi-hara-gatame(腕挫腹固)

Included Systems 
Judo

See also
Judo Techniques
Judo Lists

External links
Chez.com/Judopassion Graphical representation 1
Mcorbeil.com/Judo Graphical representation 2

References 

Judo technique